The Klimov VK-2500 is a Russian turboshaft aero engine, a high power derivative of the TV3-117VMA engine,  also for hot and high.

Design
It differs from the older versions in having an extended overhaul period of the engine hot components, extra gas-dynamic stability at varying duties, engine parameters accuracy and engine control quality, enhanced monitoring depth providing operation of the engine according to its technical condition and better weight characteristics and overall dimensions.

Variants
VK-2500-01
Has a  maximum continuous performance and a  take-off performance. Powers Ka-52.
VK-2500-02
Has a  maximum continuous performance and a  take-off performance. Used by Ka-32, and Mi-35M, Mi-28N, Mi-28NE and Mi-28UB attack helicopters.
VK-2500-03
Has  maximum continuous performance and a  take-off performance. Used by Mi-8AMTSh-V/VA and Mi-171Sh transport helicopters.
VK-2500P-01
Equipped with revised FADEC. Rated at  take-off power. Powers Mi-28NM.
VK-2500M
Next generation derivative of VK-2500 under development by Klimov, with planned reduced fuel burn and weight. Deliveries planned by 2023.
TV3-117VMA-SB3
Ukrainian designation for VK-2500.

Applications
Kamov Ka-50
Kamov Ka-52
Mil Mi-28
Mi-8AMTSh
Mi-17V-7
Mi-171A2
Mi-171E

Specifications

See also

References

External links

 Klimov VK-2500

VK-2500
1990s turboshaft engines